The 2015 South American Youth Football Championship was the 27th edition of the biennial international youth football tournament organized by CONMEBOL for the men's under-20 national teams of South America. It was held in Uruguay from 14 January to 7 February 2015.

The tournament served as qualifier for several competitions. The top four teams qualified for the 2015 FIFA U-20 World Cup in New Zealand as the CONMEBOL representatives. Brazil, as hosts, and the champion team qualified directly for the 2016 Summer Olympics men's football tournament while the runner-up team advanced to a play-off against a CONCACAF team for the final berth in the Olympics. Finally, the four teams ranked third to sixth qualified for the 2015 Pan American Games men's football tournament in Canada.

Argentina won their fifth title. defending champions Colombia finished second, Uruguay finished third, while Brazil finished fourth.

Teams
All ten CONMEBOL member national teams entered the tournament.

Venues
Uruguay was chosen as host country of the tournament on 23 May 2012 at the CONMEBOL Executive Committee meeting held in Budapest, Hungary, prior to the 62nd FIFA Congress. The matches were held in 4 venues in 3 host cities, Estadio Profesor Alberto Suppici, Colonia del Sacramento (group A) and Estadio Domingo Burgueño, Maldonado (group B) for the first stage while the final stage took place at Estadio Gran Parque Central and Estadio Centenario in Montevideo.

Squads

Each team could register a squad of 23 players (three of whom had to be goalkeepers).

Match officials
The referees and assistants referees were:

 Mauro Vigliano
Assistant: Ezequiel Brailovsky
 Alejandro Mancilla
Assistant: Wilson Arellano
 Ricardo Marques
Assistant: Kléber Lúcio Gil
 Julio Bascuñán
Assistant: Marcelo Barraza
 Adrián Vélez
Assistant: Wilmar Navarro

 Roddy Zambrano
Assistant: Luis Vera
 Enrique Cáceres
Assistant: Milciades Saldívar
 Diego Haro
Assistant: Braulio Cornejo
 Andrés Cunha
Assistant: Nicolás Tarán
 José Argote
Assistant: Jairo Romero

Draw
The draw was held on 29 September 2014, 20:15 UYT (UTC−3), at the Hipódromo Nacional de Maroñas in Montevideo. The ten teams were drawn into two groups of five. Argentina and Brazil were seeded into Group A and Group B respectively and assigned to position 1 in their group. Paraguay and Uruguay were also seeded into Group A and Group B respectively but assigned to position 2 within their group (As host, Uruguay decided to play in group B). The remaining teams were placed into "pairing pots" (Colombia–Ecuador, Chile–Peru, Bolivia–Venezuela) and drawn to determine their group as well as the position within it.

First stage
The top three teams in each group qualified for the final stage.

When teams finished level of points, the final order was determined according to:
 superior goal difference in all matches
 greater number of goals scored in all group matches
 better result in matches between the tied teams
 drawing of lots

All match times are in local Uruguay Summer Time (UTC−02:00).

Group A

Group B

Final stage
When teams finished level of points, the final order was determined according to the same criteria as the first stage, taking into account only matches in the final stage.

Winners

Goalscorers

Qualification for international tournaments

Qualified teams for FIFA U-20 World Cup
The following four teams from CONMEBOL qualified for the 2015 FIFA U-20 World Cup in New Zealand.

1 Bold indicates champions for that year. Italic indicates hosts for that year.

Qualified teams for Pan American Games
The four teams which finished third to sixth, Brazil, Uruguay, Peru, and Paraguay, qualified for the 2015 Pan American Games men's football tournament in Canada. This was changed from the previous set-up where the South American Under-17 Football Championship was used as qualification for the Pan American Games football tournament.

The following four teams from CONMEBOL qualified for the 2015 Pan American Games men's football tournament.

1 Bold indicates champions for that year. Italic indicates hosts for that year.

Qualified teams for Summer Olympics
Same as previous Youth Championships that were held one year prior to the Olympics, CONMEBOL used the tournament to determine which men's under-23 national teams from South America qualify for the Olympic football tournament. Since Brazil already qualified automatically as hosts of the 2016 Summer Olympics men's football tournament, the top-ranked team other than Brazil qualified directly, while the second top-ranked team other than Brazil advanced to a play-off against the third-placed team of the 2015 CONCACAF Men's Olympic Qualifying Championship for the final berth in the Olympics. Since Brazil finished third in the tournament, Argentina qualified for the Olympics, while Colombia advanced to the play-off, where they defeated the United States to become CONMEBOL's third Olympic representative.

The following three teams from CONMEBOL qualified for the 2016 Summer Olympics men's football tournament.

1 Bold indicates champion for that year. Italic indicates host for that year. Statistics include all Olympic format (current Olympic under-23 format started in 1992).

Media coverage

South América 

 : TyC Sports (all matches are broadcast live) and Channel 7 (Argentina matches only)
 : SporTV (all matches) and SBT (all matches of Brazil and some matches) 
 : Caracol TV (all Colombia matches live)
 : Tigo Sports (all matches are broadcast live) and La Tele (all matches of Paraguay and some matches) 
 : América Televisión (all matches are broadcast live)
 : Tenfield (all matches are broadcast live on VTV, VTV Plus and GolTV Latin América)

North America

: beIN Sports (all matches live on beIN Sports en Español)

Europe 

 : Bet365 online streaming (all matches live)

See also
2015 FIFA U-20 World Cup
Football at the 2015 Pan American Games – Men's tournament
Football at the 2016 Summer Olympics CONCACAF–CONMEBOL play-off
Football at the 2016 Summer Olympics – Men's tournament

References

External links
Sudamericano Masculino Sub 20, CONMEBOL.com 

2015
2015 South American Youth Championship
2015 in South American football
2014–15 in Uruguayan football
Football at the 2016 Summer Olympics – Men's qualification
Qualification tournaments for the 2015 Pan American Games
2015 in youth association football